Persea pyrifolia is a species of plant in the family Lauraceae. It is found in Brazil and Mexico.

References

pyrifolia
Least concern plants
Taxonomy articles created by Polbot
Plants described in 1827